Xylocopa augusti is a species of carpenter bee.

Description
These large and robust carpenter bees show a black body integument with conspicuous lateral ferruginous setae. Wings are dark brown with violet iridescence. Males are tawny, with two tufts of setae on the ventral surface of the metatibia. They can be encountered from December to March. They nest in wood and tree trunks.

Floral association
They are commonly associated to flowers of Passiflora species, but also of Agapanthus praecox, Alstroemeria pulchra, Cleome spinosa, Parkinsonia aculeatam, Quillaja saponaria, Robinia pseudoacacia, Solanum crispum, Styphnolobium japonicum, Eucalyptus sp. and Amaryllis sp. .

Distribution
This species can be found in Argentina, Chile, Brasil, Paraguay and Uruguay.

References

External links
 Eco Registros

augusti